St. Peter's School is an Independent, Coeducational, Non-Sectarian day school for children ages 3–14. Founded in 1834, it is located in the Society Hill neighborhood of Philadelphia, Pennsylvania.

History 

St. Peter's School has operated since the early 19th century. It was formally founded in 1834 as an adjunct of St. Peter's Church. It became a choir school, educating boys of all races and combined musical training with academic preparation. St. Peter's School became coeducational in 1964.

Headmasters

1915 - 1960 	Harold Gilbert

1960 - 1964 	Reverend Joseph Koci, Jr.

1967 – 1991	Caroline E. Seamans

1991 - 1993	David Murray

1993 - 2000	Melissa Vosburgh

2000 - 2012	David J. Costello

2012 – 2018	Shawn Kelly

2018–Present  Matthew Evans

Academics 

St. Peter's School is divided into three divisions: the Early Childhood Division, which includes Preschool (ages 3–4,) Prekindergarten (ages 4–5,) and Kindergarten (ages 5–6); the Lower School, made up of 1st through 4th Grades; and the Upper School, made up of 5th through 8th Grades.

The major goal of the Early Childhood Division is to learn academic and social skills, Language Arts, Math, Science, French, Yoga, Art, and Music.

Lower School core subjects are Math, Science, Social Studies, and Language Arts. Special subjects include Music, Art, French, Library, Technology, and Physical Education.

Upper School students follow an in-depth curriculum, which includes English, Math, Science, History, French, Physical Education, Art, and Music, along with arts electives, clubs, which include a student government, and a yearly Independent Study Project, where students choose a topic and research it throughout the year.

Athletics 

The athletics curriculum includes Physical Education for grades 1-5, and Soccer, Cross Country, Basketball, Fitness, and Track for grades 6-8. Dance instruction is offered as part of the school's traditional celebrations like May Day. St. Peter regularly participates in interscholastic competitions with many schools throughout the Philadelphia area.

Facilities and campus 

The Main Building is located at 319 Lombard Street, housing academic classrooms, Admissions, STEAM Lab, Science Lab and Administrative Offices.

The Alumni Theater is for performances, assemblies, Declamation, and special events.

The Robert B. Blum Library is used for Preschool - 6th Grade library classes. It is open to all students.

Gymnasium: St. Peter's Schools' sports facilities include a regulation-sized gymnasium and locker rooms located at the Old Pine Community Center. Physical Education classes for all students grades K–8 take place in the gymnasium, as do home basketball games. 
Old Pine Community Center houses the school's indoor athletic facilities and sits just across 4th Street from the school's main academic building.  St. Peter's School maintains use of the center's gymnasium, Wasson Hall meeting space, and classrooms for Special classes.

The Sally Wiggins Turf Field, also called the West Lawn, is a large green space on campus which houses a playground and organic gardens. The school uses the West Lawn and the nearby athletic fields at Starr Garden for outdoor athletic activities.  Festive events are also held on Wiggins Field and in Starr Garden throughout the school year.

St. Peter's Church and St. Peter's School share a long history. Although the two institutions separated formally in 2017 when St. Peter's School became a fully independent non-denominational school, the two institutions continue to collaborate. The school uses the church for school assemblies known as 'School Service', annually for the Celebration of Light, and Graduation.

References

Peterson's Private School Online Guide
National Association of Independent Schools

External links 
 Official site

Educational institutions established in 1834
Private K–8 schools in Pennsylvania
K–8 schools in Philadelphia
Society Hill, Philadelphia
1834 establishments in Pennsylvania